x-amounts is the second release and first full-length album from Canadian indie rock band controller.controller. It was released on October 11, 2005 in Canada by Paper Bag Records and in the United States on March 7, 2006.

Track listing
All songs by controller.controller (Basnayake/Kaija/Llewellyn-Thomas/Morris/Scheven).
"Tigers not Daughters" – 3:16
"PF" – 3:23
"Poison/Safe" – 4:43
"Rooms" – 4:04
"Future Turtles" – 1:36
"Straight in the Head" – 4:31
"City of Daggers" – 4:08
"Heavy as a Heart" – 2:26
"BLK GLV" – 2:07
"The Raw No" – 3:49
"Magnetic Strip" – 4:23

Reception

Personnel
Nirmala Basnayake – vocals
Scott Kaija – guitar, vocals
Colwyn Llewellyn-Thomas – guitar
Ronnie Morris – bass, vocals
Jeff Scheven – drums, electronica, vocals

References

2005 albums
Controller.controller albums
Paper Bag Records albums